Sunrise was a British weekday breakfast programme which was broadcast on Sky News from 6 February 1989 to 13 October 2019. The programme was replaced by The Early Rundown (Monday-Friday), Kay Burley @ Breakfast (Monday-Thursday), and Sky News @ Breakfast (Friday-Sunday) in October 2019.

History
At its beginning in February 1989, Sunrise ran from 5:00 to 9:30am. In 1991, it became one of only two slots across Sky's 20-year history to have its own individual graphics, the other being flagship bulletin Live at Five. These graphics were swiftly withdrawn after viewers and staff alike deemed them too gaudy. Sunrise has used the channel's graphics ever since. However, it is common for Sunrise to use a slight variation of some elements, such as in 1997, when it had its own variation on the-then title sequence, and in 2005 when Sunrise used an individual variation of the Sky News globe.

When Sky News relaunched on 24 October 2005, Eamonn Holmes and Lorna Dunkley became the regular presenters of the weekday editions of  Sunrise, with Steve Gaisford and Emma Crosby fronting the weekend edition. Jacquie Beltrao provided sports updates during the week. The broadcast time was now 6–9 am.

In January 2007, Dunkley moved to Sky News' weekend coverage. Holmes was then joined on Sunrise by new signing Charlotte Hawkins.

In March 2014, Hawkins left Sky News to join Good Morning Britain; her replacement was Isabel Webster, who took up her post as Sunrise co-host later that month.

Previously, weekend editions were presented by Mark Longhurst and Gillian Joseph. In 2012, Stephen Dixon replaced Longhurst on the programmes screened by Sunrise from Friday to Sunday, with Longhurst transferring over to present the weekend evening slot. Charlie Thomas continues to present sports updates.

In October 2016, Sunrise relaunched, being anchored by Sarah-Jane Mee and Jonathan Samuels from Monday to Thursday, and Stephen Dixon with Isabel Webster from Friday to Sunday. As part of these changes, Sunrise was also extended, with the programme now finishing at 10 a.m.

In August 2017, Sunrise was rebranded, with a new logo; along with this, weekday editions reverted from double-headed to mostly single-headed, with Sarah-Jane Mee presenting most of the slot, and Jonathan Samuels reading the headlines. However, weekend editions remained completely double-headed.

In January 2019, editions of Sunrise that were screened from Sunday to Friday returned to the traditional 6-9am time-frame; Saturday editions continued to run from 6-10am as before.

Since 1989, Christmas editions of Sunrise have generally been presented by Kay Burley.

Studio
On 5 February 2009 at 6am, Sunrise began presenting from a new "multi-purpose" area of the Sky News Centre, formally known as the "shoebox". This coincided with the 20th anniversary of Sky News and a revamp for the main studio.

From 10 December 2012, the Sunrise studio was refreshed, with a new blue lit desk and red sofa being introduced. The programme also received a new logo, although it only appeared on the plasma screen in the studio.

On 9 February 2015, Sunrise moved to the main Sky News desk due to their original studio position becoming flooded; this change was soon made permanent.

Between October 2016 and November 2017, Sunrise was broadcast from Studio 21 at Sky Central. The programme returned to Sky News Centre on 18 November, along with the rest of Sky News' output while work was carried out in Studio 21 and Sunrise's new studio was completed.

On 17 January 2018 Sunrise began broadcasting from Studio 6 at Sky Studios. The studio includes a virtual space to allow for segments away from the desk area, along with the sport and weather.

On 13 October 2019, the last episode of Sunrise was broadcast on Sky News, presented by Stephen Dixon and Gillian Joseph. Following the show's demise, weekday anchor Sarah-Jane Mee moved to presenting an afternoon show. Dixon and Joseph, however, continued to present breakfast hour programming in the form of Sky News @ Breakfast.

Broadcasts
Sunrise has been simulcast on Sky One intermittently over the years, most recently in February 2016. The 6am hour was also broadcast daily on Channel 5 from 2002 to 2006, and continued to be shown on Saturdays until 2008.

Presenters

Weekday presenters

Weekend presenters

Additional presenters

Stand-in Presenters

Logo gallery

References

External links
Sky News

1989 British television series debuts
2019 British television series endings
1990s British television series
2000s British television series
Breakfast television in the United Kingdom
Sky News
Sky UK original programming
English-language television shows
Sky television news shows